Ahmad bin Hussein al-Ghashmi (21 August 1935 – 24 June 1978) was the President of the Yemen Arab Republic from 11 October 1977 until his death eight months later.  Al-Ghashmi assumed power when his predecessor, Ibrahim al-Hamdi, was assassinated. Ghashmi himself was assassinated later. 

His assassination occurred when he was meeting an envoy sent by People's Democratic Republic of Yemen President Salim Rubai Ali and a briefcase, reportedly containing a secret message, exploded, killing both al-Ghashmi and the envoy. It is not conclusively known who set off the explosion. Coincidentally, Rubai Ali died in a coup three days after this event.

References

1935 births
1978 deaths
Presidents of North Yemen
Assassinated Yemeni politicians
Assassinated heads of state
People murdered in Yemen
People from Sanaa Governorate
Deaths by explosive device